Simović is a Serbo-Croatian and Ukrainian surname, a patronymic derived from given name Simo. It is historically anglicized into Simovich. It may refer to:

Aleksandar Simović, co-conspirator in the assassination of Zoran Đinđić
Aleksandar Simović (born 1992), Serbian footballer
Dušan Simović (1882–1962), Serbian military leader, Prime Minister of Yugoslavia
Edgardo Simovic (born 1975), Uruguayan soccer player
Ljubomir Simović (born 1935), poet
Marko Simović (born 1987), handball player
Miodrag Simović (born 1952), current Judge of the Constitutional Court of Bosnia and Herzegovina
Slobodan Simović (born 1989), football player
Zoran Simović (born 1954), retired Montenegrin footballer

See also
 
Simić
Simonović
Simeonović
Simeunović
Šimić
Šimunić
Šimunović

Croatian surnames
Serbian surnames
Montenegrin surnames
Ukrainian-language surnames
Patronymic surnames
Surnames from given names